NAFFCO (National Fire Fighting Manufacturing FZCO) is a Middle East-based manufacturer of firefighting products, its business being built around fire protection engineering.  It has headquarters in Dubai, United Arab Emirates (UAE), in the Jebel Ali Free Zone, and it conducts all manufacturing in the UAE.  NAFFCO is composed of two major business segments: security services and fire protection.

History 
NAFFCO was founded in 1991 by Khalid Al Khatib.  It started working as a small fire fighting equipment manufacturing factory in Jebel Ali, UAE.

Awards and recognition 
NAFFCO received Mohammed Bin Rashid Al Maktoum Business Award for excellence in exports in 2005 and excellence in manufacturing in 2006, 2010 and 2013. In 2017, NAFFCO received 9th Cycle of Mohammed Bin Rashid Al Maktoum Business Award.

References

Further reading 

 Interview with two executive directors of the company: 

Manufacturing companies established in 1991
Emergency services equipment makers
Fire detection and alarm companies
Emirati brands
Emirati companies established in 1991